Hate Eternal is a death metal band from St. Petersburg, Florida. The band currently consists of founding guitarist/vocalist Erik Rutan and bassist J. J. Hrubovcak. To date, Hate Eternal has released seven studio albums: Conquering the Throne  (1999), King of All Kings  (2002), I, Monarch  (2005), Fury & Flames  (2008), Phoenix Amongst the Ashes (2011), Infernus  (2015), and Upon Desolate Sands (2018). All albums were produced by Rutan.

History
Hate Eternal was formed in 1997. The group's original line-up included lead guitarist and lead vocalist Erik Rutan, bassist and backing vocalist Jared Anderson, drummer Tim Yeung, and rhythm guitarist Doug Cerrito. The band's name came from an old Ripping Corpse demo song.

In 2000, drummer Derek Roddy replaced Tim Yeung and toured for Conquering the Throne. In 2002 the band recorded their second album, King of All Kings as a trio with Rutan, Anderson and Roddy. That summer, Rutan left Morbid Angel, stating that he wished to devote more time to Hate Eternal.

What followed was a whirlwind of international touring to promote King of All Kings, including a noted video on MTV2's Headbanger's Ball for the single, "Powers That Be". Anderson left the group soon after due to an admitted drug problem. South Florida musician Randy Piro (a friend of Roddy) began filling in as Anderson's replacement. After completing their last tour for the album in December 2003, the group began work on new material.

2004 saw Hate Eternal begin work on the follow-up to King of All Kings, entitled I, Monarch. Recording began in the fall, and the album would eventually be released in June 2005. Hailed by critics and fans alike, the album added new percussion elements to their extreme metal sound while retaining the elements of speed and brutality that dominate the genre.

After an internally difficult US tour over the summer of 2005 and with a number of pending business problems, the group cancelled their European tour, scheduled for the fall. After spending much of the winter dealing with internal differences and personal situations, Roddy announced his departure from Hate Eternal in late March 2006.

With pending tour obligations, Erik Rutan and Randy Piro continued on and recruited drummer Kevin Talley for US appearances in the Spring, and Reno Killerich for the group's rescheduled European run. On July 26, 2007, Erik Rutan announced Jade Simonetto as the band's new permanent drummer.
 
A music video for the song "Bringer of Storms" was shot overnight January 16, 2008 by David Brodsky. Earlier in the day, the band had been in a minor traffic accident which managed to disable their brand-new van. Securing a rental and rushing to New York to play their first show with the new lineup, Hate Eternal arrived at BB King's just as the headlining act, The Black Dahlia Murder, were leaving the stage. Still wearing their jackets, Hate Eternal went onstage and performed five songs to the remaining crowd. Having completed that leg of the journey, they then drove into Brooklyn to shoot with Brodsky. Once the shoot concluded, at approximately 7am, the band had not slept in 48 hours, yet continued to their next destination to rejoin the tour. The video aired on MTV2's Headbanger's Ball in February 2008. In 2008, the band recruited J. J. Hrubovcak on bass guitar.

The band released their fifth album Phoenix Amongst the Ashes in 2011. Erik Rutan commented that "we have come up with one of [our] heaviest, most twisted, evil, melodic, and insane albums yet".
     
In October 2014, the band signed to Season of Mist. In 2014, the band recruited drummer Chason Westmoreland, who appears on the band's sixth album Infernus which was released on August 21, 2015.

Westmoreland left the band in October 2015 due to "family matters". Drummer Hannes Grossmann has been brought in for the band's upcoming North American tour.

On October 26, 2018, the band released its seventh studio album Upon Desolate Sands.

Band members

Current members
Erik Rutan – lead guitar, lead vocals ; rhythm guitar 
J.J. Hrubovcak – bass, backing vocals 

Former members 
Tim Yeung – drums 
Doug Cerrito – rhythm guitar 
Jared Anderson – bass, backing vocals 
Derek Roddy – drums 
Eric Hersemann – rhythm guitar 
Randy Piro – bass, backing vocals 
Shaune Kelley – rhythm guitar, backing vocals 
Jade Simonetto – drums 
Chason Westmoreland – drums 
Hannes Grossmann – drums 

Live members
Reno Kiilerich – drums 
Kevin Talley – drums 
Makoto Mizoguchi – bass 
Adam Jarvis – drums 
"Art" Paiz – bass, backing vocals 
John Longstreth – drums 

Session members
Alex Webster – bass

Timeline

Discography

Studio albums

Live albums

Video albums

Music videos

References

External links

 Official band website
 

Musical groups established in 1997
Death metal musical groups from Florida
Earache Records artists
Metal Blade Records artists
Season of Mist artists
American musical trios
1997 establishments in Florida